Robert Duncan (born September 2 , 1955) is an American astrophysicist working as a professor at the University of Texas at Austin.

Early life and education 
Duncan was born in Pensacola, Florida, in 1955. He earned a Bachelor of Arts degree in physics from Dartmouth College in 1977 and a PhD in physics from Cornell University in 1986. He also studied at the University of Cambridge.

Career 
From 1986 to 1988, Duncan worked as a postdoctoral researcher at Princeton University. With Christopher Thompson, he proposed and developed the theory of magnetars, and was awarded the Bruno Rossi Prize for this work in 2003.

References 

Living people
American astrophysicists
American astronomers
21st-century American physicists
University of Texas at Austin faculty
Year of birth missing (living people)

1955 births
People from Pensacola, Florida
Dartmouth College alumni
Cornell University alumni
Princeton University people